Goodenia lineata, commonly known as Grampians goodenia, is a species of flowering plant in the family Goodeniaceae and is endemic to the Grampians in Victoria, Australia. It is an erect perennial herb with lance-shaped, more or less toothed leaves with the narrower end towards the base and racemes of yellow flowers.

Description
Flowering mainly occurs from November to February but fruit and seeds have not been recorded.

Taxonomy
Goodenia lineata was first formally described by botanist Jim Willis in 1967 in the journal Muelleria. The type specimen was collected by Willis at the summit of Mount William. The specific epithet (lineata) means "marked with straight lines", referring to "the boldly striped lower half of the corolla".

Distribution and habitat
Grampians goodenia grows in heath and is restricted to the Grampians of Victoria.

Conservation status
The species is listed as "rare" by the Victorian State Wide Integrated Flora and Fauna Teams (SWIFFT).

References

lineata
Flora of Victoria (Australia)
Asterales of Australia
Grampians (national park)
Taxa named by James Hamlyn Willis
Plants described in 1967